Lavrenov Point (‘Lavrenov Nos’ \la-'vre-nov 'nos\) is a point on the north coast of Robert Island, South Shetland Islands forming the east side of the entrance to Yundola Cove.  Situated 2.7 km west of Newell Point and 2.6 km southeast of Catharina Point.  Bulgarian early mapping in 2008.  Named after the Bulgarian painter Tsanko Lavrenov (1896–1978).

Map
 L.L. Ivanov. Antarctica: Livingston Island and Greenwich, Robert, Snow and Smith Islands. Scale 1:120000 topographic map.  Troyan: Manfred Wörner Foundation, 2009.  
 Antarctic Digital Database (ADD). Scale 1:250000 topographic map of Antarctica. Scientific Committee on Antarctic Research (SCAR). Since 1993, regularly upgraded and updated.

References
 Lavrenov Point. SCAR Composite Antarctic Gazetteer
 Bulgarian Antarctic Gazetteer. Antarctic Place-names Commission. (details in Bulgarian, basic data in English)

External links
 Lavrenov Point. Copernix satellite image

Headlands of Robert Island
Bulgaria and the Antarctic